Stolobny Island is an island on Lake Seliger in the Tver Oblast of Russia, about  north of the town of Ostashkov.

Nilov Monastery
The island is the home of Nilov Monastery, which was founded by Saint Nilus in 1594, and previously welcomed up to 40,000 pilgrims each year.  Most of the buildings of the monastery were built in the 18th and 19th Centuries in a neoclassical style. Today the monastery complex remains one of the most impressive ensembles of Neoclassical architecture in Eastern Europe. Some of its churches date back to the 17th century. A graceful embankment was completed by 1812, and a large cathedral was built in 1821-25. The construction of the causeway to the island was completed in 1812. The Nilov Monastery was one of the largest and wealthiest monasteries in the Russian Empire.

Origin of name

Regarding the name of the island - "Stolobny" - there are two versions. At first, it got its name because of its shape, like a pole, and the second, is that there was an ancient pagan temple that included a sacrificial post. In 1515 the Rev. Nil (Neil in English) Krypetsky worked as a lumberjack. He lived alone, ate grass and acorns, all the time spent in prayer. According to legend, one day robbers went to Rev. Nil, and decided to kill him. However, he prayed silently, went out to them with an icon of the Blessed Virgin. The robbers, dreaming that the Rev. was defended by many armed men, fell at his feet, repented and begged forgiveness.

Gradually the fame of the hermit spread through the local villages. People began coming to him, asking prayers and teachings. In 1528, tired of all the attention, he moved to a new location - the island of Stolobny at Lake Seliger, near Ostashkov. The first year he lived in a dugout, then built a hut and a chapel for prayers. According to legend, the devil repeatedly sent different calamities against the hermit - fires, even robbers tried to throw his cell in the lake. However, Rev. Nil was adamant, overcoming all attacks by prayer and faith.

Rev. Nil lived on the island a total of 27 years before his death, and he bequeathed to build a monastery on this site, which was later made. Nil died in 1555 and was buried on Stolobny. In 1594, with the permission of the Patriarch Job, a monastic cloister opened on the island. Thus began the history of monastery Nilo - Stolobensky. The founder of the monastery was a monk Herman.

History

In 1919, after the October Revolution, the monastery was confiscated. It was closed in 1927 by the Soviet government and subsequently used for various purposes. From 1927 to 1939 there was a work camp for underage criminals.

In the period 1939 to 1941, during the first years of World War II, the monastery was a prisoner of war camp of the Russian secret service NKVD, which held approximately 7,000 Polish prisoners of war who had been taken captive by the Soviet Union following the Soviet invasion of Poland in September 1939. Almost all of the prisoners were subsequently executed in April 1940 in Kalinin (now Tver) and then buried in mass graves in Mednoye, an act which became known as the Katyn Massacre. Amongst those killed were Polish officers, lawyers, policemen, teachers, doctors, and other members of the intelligentsia.

From 1941 to 1945 there was a hospital in the building complex, and again from 1945 to 1960, a camp for minors and orphans. From 1960 to 1971 the monastery was used as a retirement home, and from 1971 to 1990 a hostel for tourists.

Current status

After 1990, the complex was given back to the Russian Orthodox Church, and in 1995 it opened again as a functioning monastery, which it still is today.

 The monastery has a few farmsteads, including in Torzhok;
 The monastery also has its own apiary (also known as a bee yard), and in the church shop you can buy consecrated honey;
 The monastery produces its own candles, milk and has a carpentry shop, a barn and stables;
 For visiting pilgrims a special hotel is available;
 The restoration of the façades of the monastery started in 2009.

Gallery

External links

 Monastery website 
 Stolobny Island website 
 More photos 
 St. Nilus Stolobensky Monastery: Resurrecting a great spiritual landmark in Russia Beyond 

Lake islands of Europe
Lake islands of Russia
Landforms of Tver Oblast
Christian monasteries established in the 16th century
Russian Orthodox monasteries in Russia
Ostashkovsky Uyezd
Prisons in the Soviet Union
Political repression in the Soviet Union
Defunct prisons in Russia